Aleksandar Aleksandrov (born 19 January 1975 in Plovdiv) is a former Bulgarian footballer who played as an attacking midfielder.

Aleksandrov was honoured as Bulgarian Footballer of the Year in 1999 and Footballer of the Year of Varna for 2007 and for 2008.

Career
Aleksandar Aleksandrov began his career in his hometown of Plovdiv in the Maritsa and played there until 1997.

Then his career lead him to Sofia, as Levski Sofia were interested and bought him. He entertained "The Blues" fans for four years, until the Turkish team Kocaelispor lured him from Levski.

Turkish teams
After two years in Kocaelispor, he changed teams and moved to Istanbulspor AS. After İstanbulspor he played in Kayserispor and Konyaspor, then signed with Ankaragucu (2006–2007).

Cherno More Varna
In July 2007, Aleksandrov returned to Bulgaria and signed a three years contract with Cherno More Varna. The following 2007–08 season in the Bulgarian championship, Alex was honoured as the most valuable player in the Bulgarian A PFG.

On 28 September 2009, Alex terminated his contract with the Sailors, due to family difficulties and problems with the owners of the club.

Return to Levski
After 10 years, Alex returned to Levski Sofia on 5 January 2010. He signed a one-a-half-year contract with the club and was given the number 7 shirt. Aleksandrov made his re-debut for Levski on 7 March 2010 against Minyor Pernik. The result of the match was 3:1 for Levski.

In the first friendly match for 2010/2011 season, Aleksandrov played with his nickname Alex, as he did in Cherno More Varna.

Botev Plovdiv
In June 2011, Aleksandrov joined Botev Plovdiv, where he would eventually retire.

International career
Between 1999 and 2003 Aleksandrov played in Bulgaria national football team. Alex earned his first cap with Bulgaria in a 3–0 victory over Luxembourg on 10 October 1999. For Bulgaria, he was capped 10 times.

Trophies won
Although not famous around the world, his career is marked by a few trophies. The first one is just after his arrival in Levski, in 1998 when "The Blues" win Bulgarian Cup. That trophy is followed by a double in 2000, when Levski not only win the Bulgarian Championship, but the Bulgarian Cup as well. Meanwhile, he has won "The Best Bulgarian Footballer" award in 1999. After his move to Kocaelispor the trophies continue to follow him, as his team wins the Turkish Cup in 2002.

Levski
Champion of Bulgaria: 2000
Bulgarian Cup: 1998, 2000
Kocaelispor
Turkish Cup: 2002
Individual
Bulgarian Footballer of the Year: 1999
Footballer of the Year of Varna: 2007, 2008

Career Stats
As of 2 September 2010.

References

External links
 Aleksandrov at Levski's official website
 Player Profile at National-Football-Teams
 Profile at Levskisofia.info

1975 births
Bulgarian footballers
Bulgaria international footballers
Living people
FC Maritsa Plovdiv players
PFC Levski Sofia players
Kayserispor footballers
Kocaelispor footballers
Konyaspor footballers
PFC Cherno More Varna players
Botev Plovdiv players
First Professional Football League (Bulgaria) players
Süper Lig players
Bulgarian expatriate footballers
Expatriate footballers in Turkey
Bulgarian expatriate sportspeople in Turkey
Association football midfielders